The 2001 Cork Senior Football Championship was the 113th staging of the Cork Senior Football Championship since its establishment by the Cork County Board in 1887. The draw for the opening fixtures took place on 10 December 2000. The championship began on 14 April 2001 and ended on 30 September 2001.

Nemo Rangers entered the championship as the defending champions.

On 30 September 2001, Nemo Rangers won the championship following a 1-14 to 0-06 defeat of Bantry Blues in the final. This was their 12th championship title overall and their second title in succession.

Team changes

To Championship

Promoted from the Cork Intermediate Football Championship
 Youghal

Results

First round

Second round

Douglas received a bye in this round.

Third round

Clyda Rovers received a bye in this round.

Fourth round

Quarter-finals

Semi-finals

Final

Championship statistics

Top scorers

Top scorers overall

In a single game

Miscellaneous

 As a result of their victory in the final, Nemo Rangers overtake Lees, who had been top of the all-time roll of honour for 111 years, on the all-time roll of honour with 12 titles.

References

Cork Senior Football Championship
Cork Senior Football Championship